Bababé  is a town and commune in the Brakna Region of southern Mauritania, located on the border with Senegal.

In 2000 it had a population of 11,802.

References

Communes of Brakna Region